Seafood is any form of sea life regarded as food by humans, prominently including fish and shellfish. Shellfish include various species of molluscs (e.g. bivalve molluscs such as clams, oysters and mussels, and cephalopods such as octopus and squid), crustaceans (e.g. shrimp, crabs, and lobster), and echinoderms (e.g. sea cucumbers and sea urchins). Historically, marine mammals such as cetaceans (whales and dolphins) as well as seals have been eaten as food, though that happens to a lesser extent in modern times. Edible sea plants such as some seaweeds and microalgae are widely eaten as sea vegetables around the world, especially in Asia. 

Seafood is an important source of (animal) protein in many diets around the world, especially in coastal areas. Semi-vegetarians who consume seafood as the only source of meat are said to adhere to pescetarianism.

The harvesting of wild seafood is usually known as fishing or hunting, while the cultivation and farming of seafood is known as aquaculture and fish farming (in the case of fish). Most of the seafood harvest is consumed by humans, but a significant proportion is used as fish food to farm other fish or rear farm animals. Some seafoods (i.e. kelp) are used as food for other plants (a fertilizer). In these ways, seafoods are used to produce further food for human consumption. Also, products such as fish oil, spirulina tablets, fish collagen, chitin are made from seafoods. Some seafood is fed to aquarium fish, or used to feed domestic pets such as cats. A small proportion is used in medicine, or is used industrially for nonfood purposes (e.g. leather).

History

The harvesting, processing, and consuming of seafoods are ancient practices with archaeological evidence dating back well into the Paleolithic. Findings in a sea cave at Pinnacle Point in South Africa indicate Homo sapiens (modern humans) harvested marine life as early as 165,000 years ago, while the Neanderthals, an extinct human species contemporary with early Homo sapiens, appear to have been eating seafood at sites along the Mediterranean coast beginning around the same time. Isotopic analysis of the skeletal remains of Tianyuan man, a 40,000-year-old anatomically modern human from eastern Asia, has shown that he regularly consumed freshwater fish. Archaeology features such as shell middens, discarded fish bones and cave paintings show that sea foods were important for survival and consumed in significant quantities. During this period, most people lived a hunter-gatherer lifestyle and were, of necessity, constantly on the move. However, early examples of permanent settlements (though not necessarily permanently occupied), such as those at Lepenski Vir, were almost always associated with fishing as a major source of food.

The ancient river Nile was full of fish; fresh and dried fish were a staple food for much of the population. The Egyptians had implements and methods for fishing and these are illustrated in tomb scenes, drawings, and papyrus documents. Some representations hint at fishing being pursued as a pastime.

Fishing scenes are rarely represented in ancient Greek culture, a reflection of the low social status of fishing. However, Oppian of Corycus, a Greek author wrote a major treatise on sea fishing, the Halieulica or Halieutika, composed between 177 and 180. This is the earliest such work to have survived to the modern day. The consumption of fish varied in accordance with the wealth and location of the household. In the Greek islands and on the coast, fresh fish and seafood (squid, octopus, and shellfish) were common. They were eaten locally but more often transported inland. Sardines and anchovies were regular fare for the citizens of Athens. They were sometimes sold fresh, but more frequently salted. A stele of the late 3rd century BCE from the small Boeotian city of Akraiphia, on Lake Copais, provides us with a list of fish prices. The cheapest was skaren (probably parrotfish) whereas Atlantic bluefin tuna was three times as expensive. Common salt water fish were yellowfin tuna, red mullet, ray, swordfish or sturgeon, a delicacy which was eaten salted. Lake Copais itself was famous in all Greece for its eels, celebrated by the hero of The Acharnians. Other fresh water fish were pike-fish, carp and the less appreciated catfish.

Pictorial evidence of Roman fishing comes from mosaics. At a certain time the goatfish was considered the epitome of luxury, above all because its scales exhibit a bright red colour when it dies out of water. For this reason these fish were occasionally allowed to die slowly at the table. There even was a recipe where this would take place in garo, in the sauce. At the beginning of the Imperial era, however, this custom suddenly came to an end, which is why mullus in the feast of Trimalchio (see the Satyricon) could be shown as a characteristic of the parvenu, who bores his guests with an unfashionable display of dying fish.

In medieval times, seafood was less prestigious than other animal meats, and often seen as merely an alternative to meat on fast days. Still, seafood was the mainstay of many coastal populations. Kippers made from herring caught in the North Sea could be found in markets as far away as Constantinople. While large quantities of fish were eaten fresh, a large proportion was salted, dried, and, to a lesser extent, smoked. Stockfish, cod that was split down the middle, fixed to a pole and dried, was very common, though preparation could be time-consuming, and meant beating the dried fish with a mallet before soaking it in water. A wide range of mollusks including oysters, mussels and scallops were eaten by coastal and river-dwelling populations, and freshwater crayfish were seen as a desirable alternative to meat during fish days. Compared to meat, fish was much more expensive for inland populations, especially in Central Europe, and therefore not an option for most.

Modern knowledge of the reproductive cycles of aquatic species has led to the development of hatcheries and improved techniques of fish farming and aquaculture. Better understanding of the hazards of eating raw and undercooked fish and shellfish has led to improved preservation methods and processing.

Types of seafood

The following table is based on the ISSCAAP classification (International Standard Statistical Classification of Aquatic Animals and Plants) used by the FAO for the purposes of collecting and compiling fishery statistics. The production figures have been extracted from the FAO FishStat database, and include both capture from wild fisheries and aquaculture production.

Processing

Fish is a highly perishable product: the "fishy" smell of dead fish is due to the breakdown of amino acids into biogenic amines and ammonia.

Live food fish are often transported in tanks at high expense for an international market that prefers its seafood killed immediately before it is cooked. Delivery of live fish without water is also being explored. While some seafood restaurants keep live fish in aquaria for display purposes or for cultural beliefs, the majority of live fish are kept for dining customers. The live food fish trade in Hong Kong, for example, is estimated to have driven imports of live food fish to more than 15,000 tonnes in 2000. Worldwide sales that year were estimated at US$400 million, according to the World Resources Institute.

If the cool chain has not been adhered to correctly, food products generally decay and become harmful before the validity date printed on the package. As the potential harm for a consumer when eating rotten fish is much larger than for example with dairy products, the U.S. Food and Drug Administration (FDA) has introduced regulation in the USA requiring the use of a time temperature indicator on certain fresh chilled seafood products.

Because fresh fish is highly perishable, it must be eaten promptly or discarded; it can be kept for only a short time. In many countries, fresh fish are filleted and displayed for sale on a bed of crushed ice or refrigerated. Fresh fish is most commonly found near bodies of water, but the advent of refrigerated train and truck transportation has made fresh fish more widely available inland.

Long term preservation of fish is accomplished in a variety of ways. The oldest and still most widely used techniques are drying and salting. Desiccation (complete drying) is commonly used to preserve fish such as cod. Partial drying and salting is popular for the preservation of fish like herring and mackerel. Fish such as salmon, tuna, and herring are cooked and canned. Most fish are filleted prior to canning, but some small fish (e.g. sardines) are only decapitated and gutted prior to canning.

Consumption

Seafood is consumed all over the world; it provides the world's prime source of high-quality protein: 14–16% of the animal protein consumed worldwide; over one billion people rely on seafood as their primary source of animal protein. Fish is among the most common food allergens.

Since 1960, annual global seafood consumption has more than doubled to over 20 kg per capita. Among top consumers are Korea (78.5 kg per head), Norway (66.6 kg) and Portugal (61.5 kg).

The UK Food Standards Agency recommends that at least two portions of seafood should be consumed each week, one of which should be oil-rich. There are over 100 different types of seafood available around the coast of the UK.

Oil-rich fish such as mackerel or herring are rich in long chain Omega-3 oils. These oils are found in every cell of the human body, and are required for human biological functions such as brain functionality.

Whitefish such as haddock and cod are very low in fat and calories which, combined with oily fish rich in Omega-3 such as mackerel, sardines, fresh tuna, salmon and trout, can help to protect against coronary heart disease, as well as helping to develop strong bones and teeth.

Shellfish are particularly rich in zinc, which is essential for healthy skin and muscles as well as fertility. Casanova reputedly ate 50 oysters a day.

Texture and taste
Over 33,000 species of fish and many more marine invertebrate species have been described. Bromophenols, which are produced by marine algae, gives marine animals an odor and taste that is absent from freshwater fish and invertebrates. Also, a chemical substance called dimethylsulfoniopropionate (DMSP) that is found in red and green algae is transferred into animals in the marine food chain. When broken down, dimethyl sulfide (DMS) is produced, and is often released during food preparation when fresh fish and shellfish are heated. In small quantities it creates a specific smell one associates with the ocean, but which in larger quantities gives the impression of rotten seaweed and old fish. Another molecule known as TMAO occurs in fishes and give them a distinct smell. It also exists in freshwater species, but becomes more numerous in the cells of an animal the deeper it lives, so that fish from the deeper parts of the ocean has a stronger taste than species who lives in shallow water. Eggs from seaweed contains sex pheromones called dictyopterenes, which are meant to attract the sperm. These pheromones are also found in edible seaweeds, which contributes to their aroma. However, only a small number of species are commonly eaten by humans.

Health benefits

There is broad scientific consensus that docosahexaenoic acid (DHA) and eicosapentaenoic acid (EPA) found in seafood are beneficial to neurodevelopment and cognition, especially at young ages. The United Nations Food and Agriculture Organization has described fish as "nature's super food." Seafood consumption is associated with improved neurologic development during pregnancy and early childhood and more tenuously linked to reduced mortality from coronary heart disease. 

Fish consumption has been associated with a decreased risk of dementia, lung cancer and stroke. A 2020 umbrella review concluded that fish consumption reduces all-cause mortality, cancer, cardiovascular disease, stroke and other outcomes. The review suggested that two to four servings per week is generally safe. However, two other recent umbrella reviews have found no statistically significant associations between fish consumption and cancer risks and have cautioned researchers when it comes to interpreting reported associations between fish consumption and cancer risks because the quality of evidence is very low.

The parts of fish containing essential fats and micronutrients, often cited as primary health benefits for eating seafood, are frequently discarded in the developed world. Micronutrients including calcium, potassium, selenium, zinc, and iodine are found in their highest concentrations in the head, intestines, bones, and scales.

Government recommendations promote moderate consumption of fish. The US Food and Drug Administration recommends moderate (4 oz for children and 8 - 12 oz for adults, weekly) consumption of fish as part of a healthy and balanced diet. The UK National Health Service gives similar advice, recommending at least 2 portions (about 10 oz) of fish weekly. The Chinese National Health Commission recommends slightly more, advising 10 - 20 oz of fish weekly.

Health hazards

There are numerous factors to consider when evaluating health hazards in seafood. These concerns include marine toxins, microbes, foodborne illness, radionuclide contamination, and man-made pollutants. Shellfish are among the more common food allergens. Most of these dangers can be mitigated or avoided with accurate knowledge of when and where seafood is caught. However, consumers have limited access to relevant and actionable information in this regard and the seafood industry's systemic problems with mislabelling make decisions about what is safe even more fraught.

Ciguatera fish poisoning (CFP) is an illness resulting from consuming toxins produced by dinoflagellates which bioaccumulate in the liver, roe, head, and intestines of reef fish. It is the most common disease associated with seafood consumption and poses the greatest risk to consumers. The population of plankton which produces these toxins varies significantly over time and location, as seen in red tides. Evaluating the risk of ciguatera in any given fish requires specific knowledge of its origin and life history, information which is often inaccurate or unavailable. While ciguatera is relatively widespread compared to other seafood-related health hazards (up to 50,000 people suffer from ciguatera every year), mortality is very low.

Scombroid food poisoning, is also a seafood illness. It is typically caused by from eating fish high in histamine from being stored or processing improperly.

Fish and shellfish have a natural tendency to concentrate inorganic and organic toxins and pollutants in their bodies, including methylmercury, a highly toxic organic compound of mercury, polychlorinated biphenyls (PCBs), and microplastics. Species of fish that are high on the food chain, such as shark, swordfish, king mackerel, albacore tuna, and tilefish contain higher concentrations of these bioaccumulants. This is because bioaccumulants are stored in the muscle tissues of fish, and when a predatory fish eats another fish, it assumes the entire body burden of bioaccumulants in the consumed fish. Thus species that are high on the food chain amass body burdens of bioaccumulants that can be ten times higher than the species they consume. This process is called biomagnification.

Man-made disasters can cause localised hazards in seafood which may spread widely via piscine food chains. The first occurrence of widespread mercury poisoning in humans occurred this way in the 1950s in Minamata, Japan. Wastewater from a nearby chemical factory released methylmercury that accumulated in fish which were consumed by humans. Severe mercury poisoning is now known as Minamata disease. The 2011 Fukushima Daiichi Nuclear Power Plant disaster and 1947 - 1991 Marshall Islands nuclear bomb testing led to dangerous radionuclide contamination of local sea life which, in the latter case, remained as of 2008.

A widely cited study in JAMA which synthesised government and MEDLINE reports, and meta-analyses to evaluate risks from methylmercury, dioxins, and polychlorinated biphenyls to cardiovascular health and links between fish consumption and neurologic outcomes concluded that: "The benefits of modest fish consumption (1-2 servings/wk) outweigh the risks among adults and, excepting a few selected fish species, among women of childbearing age. Avoidance of modest fish consumption due to confusion regarding risks and benefits could result in thousands of excess CHD [congenital heart disease] deaths annually and suboptimal neurodevelopment in children."

Mislabelling

Due to the wide array of options in the seafood marketplace, seafood is far more susceptible to mislabeling than terrestrial food. There are more than 1,700 species of seafood in the United States' consumer marketplace, 80 - 90% of which are imported and less than 1% of which is tested for fraud. However, more recent research into seafood imports and consumption patterns among consumers in the United States suggests 35%-38% of seafood products are of domestic origin.  consumption suggests Estimates of mislabelled seafood in the United States range from 33% in general up to 86% for particular species.

Byzantine supply chains, frequent bycatch, brand naming, species substitution, and inaccurate ecolabels all contribute to confusion for the consumer. A 2013 study by Oceana found that one third of seafood sampled from the United States was incorrectly labelled. Snapper and tuna were particularly susceptible to mislabelling, and seafood substitution was the most common type of fraud. Another type of mislabelling is short-weighting, where practices such as overglasing or soaking can misleadingly increase the apparent weight of the fish. For supermarket shoppers, many seafood products are unrecognisable fillets. Without sophisticated DNA testing, there is no foolproof method to identify a fish species without their head, skin, and fins. This creates easy opportunities to substitute cheap products for expensive ones, a form of economic fraud.

Beyond financial concerns, significant health risks arise from hidden pollutants and marine toxins in an already fraught marketplace. Seafood fraud has led to widespread keriorrhea due to mislabeled escolar, mercury poisoning from products marketed as safe for pregnant women, and hospitalisation and neurological damage due to mislabeled pufferfish. For example, a 2014 study published in PLOS One found that 15% of MSC certified Patagonian toothfish originated from uncertified and mercury polluted fisheries. These fishery-stock substitutions had 100% more mercury than their genuine counterparts, "vastly exceeding" limits in Canada, New Zealand, and Australia.

Sustainability

Research into population trends of various species of seafood is pointing to a global collapse of seafood species by 2048. Such a collapse would occur due to pollution and overfishing, threatening oceanic ecosystems, according to some researchers.

A major international scientific study released in November 2006 in the journal Science found that about one-third of all fishing stocks worldwide have collapsed (with a collapse being defined as a decline to less than 10% of their maximum observed abundance), and that if current trends continue all fish stocks worldwide will collapse within fifty years. In July 2009, Boris Worm of Dalhousie University, the author of the November 2006 study in Science, co-authored an update on the state of the world's fisheries with one of the original study's critics, Ray Hilborn of the University of Washington at Seattle. The new study found that through good fisheries management techniques even depleted fish stocks can be revived and made commercially viable again. An analysis published in August 2020 indicates that seafood could theoretically increase sustainably by 36–74% by 2050 compared to current yields and that whether or not these production potentials are realised sustainably depends on a number of factors "such as policy reforms, technological innovation and the extent of future shifts in demand".

The FAO State of World Fisheries and Aquaculture 2004 report estimates that in 2003, of the main fish stocks or groups of resources for which assessment information is available, "approximately one-quarter were overexploited, depleted or recovering from depletion (16%, 7% and 1% respectively) and needed rebuilding."

The National Fisheries Institute, a trade advocacy group representing the United States seafood industry, disagree. They claim that currently observed declines in fish population are due to natural fluctuations and that enhanced technologies will eventually alleviate whatever impact humanity is having on oceanic life.

In religion

For the most part Islamic dietary laws allow the eating of seafood, though the Hanbali forbid eels, the Shafi forbid frogs and crocodiles, and the Hanafi forbid bottom feeders such as shellfish and carp. The Jewish laws of Kashrut forbid the eating of shellfish and eels. In the Old Testament, the Mosaic Covenant allowed the Israelites to eat Finfish, but shellfish and eels were an abomination and not allowed.

In the New Testament Luke 24 Jesus' eating of a fish and Jesus telling his disciples where to catch fish, before cooking it for them to eat. Pescatarianism was widespread in the early Church, among both the clergy and laity. In ancient and medieval times, the Catholic Church forbade the practice of eating meat, eggs and dairy products during Lent. Thomas Aquinas argued that these "afford greater pleasure as food [than fish], and greater nourishment to the human body, so that from their consumption there results a greater surplus available for seminal matter, which when abundant becomes a great incentive to lust." In the United States, the Catholic practice of abstaining from meat on Fridays during Lent has popularised the Friday fish fry, and parishes often sponsor a fish fry during Lent. In predominantly Roman Catholic areas, restaurants may adjust their menus during Lent by adding seafood items to the menu.

See also

 Cold chain
 Culinary name
 Fish as food
 Fish processing
 Fish market
 Friend of the Sea
 Got Mercury?
 Jellyfish as food
 List of fish dishes
 List of foods
 List of harvested aquatic animals by weight
 List of seafood companies
 List of seafood dishes
 List of seafood restaurants
 Oyster bar
 Raw bar
 Safe Harbor Certified Seafood
 Seafood Watch, sustainable consumer guide (USA)
 Shark meat

References

Citations

Sources 

 Adamson, Melitta Weiss (2004) Food in Medieval Times Greenwood Press. .
 Adamson, Melitta Weiss (2002) Regional Cuisines of Medieval Europe: A Book of Essays Routledge. .
 Alasalvar C, Miyashita K, Shahidi F and Wanasundara U (2011) Handbook of Seafood Quality, Safety and Health Applications John Wiley & Sons. .
 Athenaeus of Naucratis The Deipnosophists; or, Banquet of the learned Vol 3, Charles Duke Yonge (trans) 1854. H.G. Bohn.
 Dalby, A. (1996) Siren Feasts: A History of Food and Gastronomy in Greece Routledge. .
 Granata LA, Flick GJ Jr and Martin RE (eds) (2012) The Seafood Industry: Species, Products, Processing, and Safety John Wiley & Sons. .
 Green, Aliza (2007) Field Guide to Seafood: How to Identify, Select, and Prepare Virtually Every Fish and Shellfish at the Market Quirk Books. .
 McGee, Harold (2004) On Food And Cooking: The Science and Lore of the Kitchen Simon and Schuster. .
 Peterson, James and editors of Seafood Business (2009) Seafood Handbook: The Comprehensive Guide to Sourcing, Buying and Preparation John Wiley & Sons. .
 Potter, Jeff (2010) Cooking for Geeks: Real Science, Great Hacks, and Good Food O'Reilly Media. .
 
 Regensteinn J M and Regensteinn C E (2000) "Religious food laws and the seafood industry" In: R E Martin, E P Carter, G J Flick Jr and L M Davis (Eds) (2000) Marine and freshwater products handbook, CRC Press. .
 Snodgrass, Mary Ellen (2004) Encyclopedia of Kitchen History .
 Stickney, Robert (2009) Aquaculture: An Introductory Text CABI. .

Further reading

 Alasalvar C, Miyashita K, Shahidi F and Wanasundara U (2011) Handbook of Seafood Quality, Safety and Health Applications, John Wiley & Sons. .
 Ainsworth, Mark (2009) Fish and Seafood: Identification, Fabrication, Utilization Cengage Learning. .
 Anderson, James L (2003) The International Seafood Trade Woodhead Publishing. .
 Babal, Ken (2010) Seafood Sense: The Truth about Seafood Nutrition and Safety ReadHowYouWant.com. .
 Botana, Luis M (2000) Seafood and Freshwater Toxins: Pharmacology, Physiology and Detection CRC Press. .
 Boudreaux, Edmond (2011) The Seafood Capital of the World: Biloxi's Maritime History The History Press. .
 Granata LA, Martin RE and Flick GJ Jr (2012) The Seafood Industry: Species, Products, Processing, and Safety John Wiley & Sons. .
 
 Luten, Joop B (Ed.) (2006) Seafood Research From Fish To Dish: Quality, Safety and Processing of Wild and Farmed Fish Wageningen Academic Pub. .
 McDermott, Ryan (2007) Toward a More Efficient Seafood Consumption Advisory ProQuest. .
 Nesheim MC and Yaktine AL (Eds) (2007) Seafood Choices: Balancing Benefits and Risks National Academies Press. .
 Shames, Lisa (2011) Seafood Safety: FDA Needs to Improve Oversight of Imported Seafood and Better Leverage Limited Resources DIANE Publishing. .
 
 Trewin C and Woolfitt A (2006) Cornish Fishing and Seafood Alison Hodge Publishers. .
 UNEP (2009) The Role of Supply Chains in Addressing the Global Seafood Crisis UNEP/Earthprint
 Upton, Harold F (2011) Seafood Safety: Background Issues DIANE Publishing. .

External links

 Wikibooks Cookbook

 
!